Stereopalpus is a genus of antlike flower beetles in the family Anthicidae. There are about 11 described species in Stereopalpus.

Species
These 11 species belong to the genus Stereopalpus:
 Stereopalpus bifidus Abdullah, 1965
 Stereopalpus californicus Abdullah, 1965
 Stereopalpus carolinensis Abdullah, 1965
 Stereopalpus columbianus Hopping, 1925
 Stereopalpus guttatus LeConte, 1855
 Stereopalpus hirtus Hatch, 1965
 Stereopalpus mellyi LaFerté-Sénectère, 1846
 Stereopalpus nimius Casey, 1895
 Stereopalpus pruinosus LeConte, 1874
 Stereopalpus rufipes Casey, 1895
 Stereopalpus vestitus (Say, 1824)

References

Further reading

 
 

Anthicidae
Articles created by Qbugbot